The Stadio Nazionale del PNF (English: National Stadium of the National Fascist Party) was a multi-purpose stadium in Rome, Italy. It hosted three of the 17 matches of the 1934 FIFA World Cup, including the final between hosts Italy and Czechoslovakia on 10 June 1934.

The Stadio Nazionale was constructed in 1911, and was renovated in 1928 for the Italy–Hungary international match.

The stadium closed in 1953 and was replaced by the Stadio Flaminio in 1957.

1934 FIFA World Cup
Stadio Nazionale PNF hosted three games of the 1934 FIFA World Cup, including the final matches.

References 

Sports venues completed in 1911
Sports venues demolished in 1957
Sports venues in Rome
1934 FIFA World Cup stadiums
Nazionale
Nazionale PNF
Nazionale
Multi-purpose stadiums in Italy
1911 establishments in Italy
1957 disestablishments in Italy